In molecular biology, Maternally expressed 8 (non-protein coding), also known as MEG8 or Rian (RNA Imprinted and Accumulated in Nucleus), is a long non-coding RNA. It is an imprinted gene, which is maternally expressed. It is expressed in the nucleus and (in an eight-week-old sheep) is preferentially expressed in skeletal muscle.

See also 
 Long noncoding RNA

References

Further reading 
 

Non-coding RNA